Elza Akhmerova, also Elsa Akhmerova was an American citizen, born Helen Lowry.  She is a niece of Earl Browder,  General Secretary of the Communist Party of the United States (CPUSA). She died of leukemia.

From 1936 to 1939, Lowry was an equal partner in espionage with her husband Iskhak Akhmerov, a Soviet NKVD intelligence agent. Iskhak Akhmerov operated an espionage network in the United States, and both of the Akhmerovs are referenced in VENONA decryptions of Soviet cable traffic: Lowry is listed under the Soviet code name "ADA" (later changed to ELZA (ELSA)). As a native-born American and English speaker, Akhmerova was able to freely operate on behalf of Soviet intelligence.  She was a full partner in her husband's espionage activity, and is referenced in several Venona project decryptions.  In 1939, she married Akhmerov.  In 1945, Lowry was named by Soviet intelligence agent Elizabeth Bentley as one of her contacts.

According to Pavel Sudoplatov, her husband ran one of five spy rings targeting the United States for atomic bomb secrets. The Akhmerov led ring targeted United States Communist Party members for the Kremlin's needs.

See also
 Earl Browder
 Iskhak Akhmerov

Notes

References

External links
Robert Louis Benson, VENONA Historical Monograph #3: "The 1944–45 New York and Washington-Moscow KGB Messages."
Haynes, John Earl and Harvey Klehr, Venona: Decoding Soviet Espionage in America. Yale University Press. (2000)
Schecter, Jerrold and Leona, Sacred Secrets: How Soviet Intelligence Operations Changed American History. Potomac Books (2002)
Aleksandr Vassiliev's Notes from KGB archives on Akhmerova

Year of birth missing
Year of death missing
American spies for the Soviet Union
American people in the Venona papers
American emigrants to the Soviet Union
Espionage in the United States